WLOG (89.1 FM) was a radio station licensed to Markleysburg, Pennsylvania, United States. The station was owned by Radio By Grace, Inc.

Radio By Grace surrendered WLOG's license to the Federal Communications Commission on December 27, 2021, who cancelled it the same day.

Translators
In addition to the main station, WLOG was relayed by an additional three translators to widen its broadcast area.

References

External links

LOG (FM)
Defunct religious radio stations in the United States
Radio stations established in 2003
2003 establishments in Pennsylvania
Defunct radio stations in the United States
Radio stations disestablished in 2021
2021 disestablishments in Pennsylvania
LOG (FM)